David Hugh Bannerman is a retired South African Anglican bishop.

Education 

Bannerman holds a Diploma in Theology (St Paul's College, Grahamstown), BA (Unisa), a BAHons Psy (Unisa) and Master's in Theology (Unisa).

Clerical career 

Bannerman started his church career in 1973 at St. John's Cathedral, Bulawayo and then moved to the Diocese of Bloemfontein in 1977.  In 1995 he moved to the Diocese of South Eastern Transvaal where he became Rector of St. Dunstan's Cathedral and Dean in 1999. In succession to David Beetge, he was consecrated as bishop and installed as Bishop of the Highveld on 25 April 2009. Retiring, Bannerman's term of office ended on 31 January 2015.

He was granted Permission to Officiate in The Diocese of Canterbury, for a period of three years, with effect from 10 May 2021.

Honours and awards 

He was made an honorary canon of Bloemfontein Cathedral in 1994 and a Knight of the Most Venerable Order of St John of Jerusalem in 2007.

Other work 
Bannerman served as Chairperson of the Diocesan Counselling Board and Chairperson of the Diocesan Link Group (Diocese of Monmouth), a Director of the Highveld Anglican Board of Social Responsibility and a member of the St. Dunstan's College Council.

Personal life 

Bannerman is married to Joan and they had two children, Katherine and Eleanor – Eleanor died in 1992.  Joan is a remedial therapist at St. Dunstan's College.

Notes and references

 
 
 

20th-century South African Anglican priests
Year of birth missing (living people)
Living people
Anglican bishops of the Highveld
21st-century Anglican Church of Southern Africa bishops